Michael Zeidman (born Michael Jason Zeidman in New York City March 9, 1985) is a singer, actor, pianist and musician. He was also a child actor and an original member of The Broadway Kids. He graduated medical school at Northeast Ohio Medical University in 2013 and is currently completed a general surgery residency at Montefiore Medical Center. He is currently in Fellowship at Mount Sinai in Breast Surgery.

Film and television work
Mar 12, 1987 - May 18, 2003, Les Misérables (Original musical), Gavroche (replacement)
 Apr 22, 1993 - Jun 17, 1995 The Who's Tommy, Tommy age 10 -(replacement) 
Backfire! (1995 film), Young Jeremy 
Kathie Lee Gifford: We Need a Little Christmas (TV movie 1996), himself, musical guest

Discography
Jump Up And Sing: Binyah's Favorite Songs CD  (1996)
Sing Christmas CD / Broadway Kids (1997)
At The Movies CD / Broadway Kids (1997)

References 

American male child actors
1985 births
Living people
Musicians from New York City
American male pianists
21st-century American pianists
21st-century American male musicians